The Mid-West Athletic Conference (MWAC) is an athletic conference in the National Junior College Athletic Association (NJCAA). The Mid-West Athletic Conference is a two-year college conference composing the two-year schools in Central and South Central Illinois, and one school in Southwestern Indiana, who also compete as part of the NJCAA in its Region XXIV (or Region 24). Conference championships are held in most sports and individuals can be named to All-Conference and All-Academic teams.  The conference itself is a Division-II organization though some member schools feature teams that compete at the Division-I or Division-III levels.

Member schools

Current members
The MWAC currently has nine full members, all are public schools:

Notes

Sports

Men's sponsored sports by school

{| class="wikitable"
|+ Men's varsity not sponsored by the Mid-West Athletic Conference that are played by schools|-
! scope="col" | School
! scope="col" | Cross Country
! scope="col" | E-Sports
! scope="col" | Tennis
! scope="col" | Bowling
! scope="col" | Track and Field
|-
| Danville Area Community College
| Yes
| Yes
|
|
|
|-
| Heartland Community College
| Yes
| Yes
|
|
|
|-
| John Wood Community College
|
| Yes
|
|
|-
| Lewis & Clark Community College
|
|
| Yes
|
|
|-
| Parkland College
|
|Yes
| 
|
|-
| Spoon River College
|
| Yes
|
|
|
|-
| Vincennes University
| Yes
| Yes
|
| Yes
| Yes
|-
|}

Women's sponsored sports by schoolWomen's varsity not sponsored by the Mid-West Athletic Conference that are played by schools'''

See also
National Junior College Athletic Association (NJCAA)

References

External links
MWAC official website
NJCAA Region 24 website
NJCAA Website

NJCAA conferences
College sports in Illinois